The 1928 Summer Olympics Water Polo event was held between the fourth and eleventh of August. The final results of the tournament follow below.

Competition format

The water polo tournament consisted primarily of a single-elimination bracket that determined the gold and silver medals. The bronze medal was supposed to be awarded through a modified Bergvall system tournament, in which the teams who lost to the top two nations (that is, Belgium and Great Britain—who had lost to Germany—and France, the United States, and Argentina—who had lost to Hungary) would conduct another single-elimination tournament for the third place. However, the tournament organizers did not understand the system. The Official Report lists three third-place matches, in which France beat Great Britain, the United States, and Argentina in succession. Sports-reference also lists two additional matches, between the United States and Malta and between the Netherlands and Belgium, also stating that "some of the matches played may have been friendlies or exhibitions." The France–Great Britain match is treated as the bronze medal game herein.

Results
For the team rosters see: Water polo at the 1928 Summer Olympics – Men's team squads.

Bracket

Round of 16

Quarterfinals

Semifinals

Bronze medal game

Final

Participating nations
Each country was allowed to enter a team of 11 players and they all were eligible for participation.

A total of 109(*) water polo players from 14 nations competed at the Amsterdam Games:

 
 
 
 
 
 
 
 
 
 
 
 
 
 

(*) NOTE: There are only players counted, which participated in one game at least.

Final standings

References

Sources
 PDF documents in the LA84 Foundation Digital Library:
 Official Report of the 1928 Olympic Games (download, archive) (pp. 746–757, 797–807)
 Water polo on the Olympedia website
 Water polo at the 1928 Summer Olympics (men's tournament)
 Water polo on the Sports Reference website
 Water polo at the 1928 Summer Games (men's tournament) (archived)

 
1928 Summer Olympics events
1928
1928 in water polo
1928